Rivingen Lighthouse is a coastal lighthouse in the municipality of Grimstad in Agder county, Norway. The lighthouse was first established in 1886 on a small island at the southern approach to the harbour of the town of Grimstad.

The light emits a flash of light every 5 seconds. The light is white, red, or green depending on the direction.

History
The original 1886 tower has been inactive since 1925. The tower is attached to the front of a one and a half story keeper's house. The old tower and house are now a privately owned summer residence which is only accessible by boat.

See also
Lighthouses in Norway
List of lighthouses in Norway

References

Lighthouses in Agder
Grimstad